Juan Fernando Arango Sáenz (born 16 May 1980) is a Venezuelan former professional footballer who played as an attacking midfielder.
 
He spent the better part of his professional career in La Liga with Mallorca, appearing in 196 official games, and also played several years with Borussia Mönchengladbach for which he signed at the age of 29.

Arango was Venezuela's record holder in international caps and goals for several years, scoring 22 times in 129 matches between 1999 and 2015. He represented the nation in six Copa América tournaments.

Club career

Early years and Mallorca
Arango's parents hailed from Colombia, having immigrated to Venezuela before he was born, in the city of Maracay. He started playing as a professional at the age of sixteen with Nueva Cádiz FC, which ascended to the Venezuelan Primera División the following season under the name Zulia FC.

The following year, Arango joined Caracas FC but, after six months playing with the team he was bought by Mexico's C.F. Monterrey. He represented two other clubs in the latter country, C.F. Pachuca and Puebla FC, until 2004, when he joined La Liga side RCD Mallorca in Spain (coached by Benito Floro, also his boss at Monterrey) on a one-year link, with an option for a further three.

On 20 March 2005, Arango suffered a serious injury after a brutal collision with Sevilla FC's Javi Navarro. He fell unconscious, broke his cheekbone, swallowed his tongue and got serious cuts in his face; he returned to play a month later and, in the following season, was the team's top scorer with 11 league goals.

In 2006, EFE chose Arango as the third best Latin American player in the Spanish league, with the first place taken by Pablo Aimar. The following year, he also obtained a Spanish passport, in March. On 9 March 2008, he scored his first hat-trick for Mallorca, in a 7–1 home thrashing of Recreativo de Huelva, with teammate Dani Güiza – who finished as the campaign's Pichichi – adding two; he only missed one league game from 2005 to 2008 combined.

Borussia Mönchengladbach

On 26 June 2009, as his contract was due to expire at the end of 2009–10, Arango was sold to Borussia Mönchengladbach for €3.6 million, penning a three-year contract. In his third season in the Bundesliga he netted six goals in 34 games and also provided 12 assists, as his team finished fourth and qualified for the UEFA Champions League.

On 10 December 2012, Gladbach manager Lucien Favre hailed Arango as one of the best left-footed players in the world, after the Venezuelan scored a 48-yard stunner in a 2–0 defeat of 1. FSV Mainz 05 the previous day. In the following year, he was ranked as the most popular footballer in the world by the International Federation of Football History & Statistics.

Arango scored his first goal of the 2013–14 campaign on 24 August 2013, but in a 2–4 away defeat to Bayer 04 Leverkusen. He also found the net in his team's next league fixture, opening the scoring in a 4–1 home success over SV Werder Bremen.

Tijuana
Arango returned to Mexico at the age of 34, signing with Club Tijuana on 22 May 2014. In April of the following year, he was handed a two-match ban by the Mexican Football Federation after footage showed him biting Monterrey player Jesús Zavala in an action that eluded the referee.

Late career
On 28 January 2016, Arango joined the New York Cosmos of the North American Soccer League. Aged 36, he returned to both his country and Zulia one year later.

Arango then had another spell with the Cosmos, leaving in January 2018.

International career
At the 2004 Copa América, Arango appeared in all three group stage matches for Venezuela. In the 2007 edition, held in his country, he helped the national team finish first in the group stage, and scored in the quarterfinals against Uruguay, but in a 4–1 defeat.

Also in that year, Arango was chosen national team captain by newly appointed coach César Farías. In the 2011 Copa América in Argentina, he helped the Vinotinto to a best-ever fourth-place finish in the continental competition, scoring in the third-place match, a 1–4 loss against Peru for what was his 100th cap.

In his 116th international appearance, Arango levelled the record for the most goals scored for Venezuela with 22 goals, scoring in the 56th minute against Bolivia in a 1–1 draw for the 2014 FIFA World Cup qualifiers on 7 June 2013.

Style of play
A left-footed playmaker, who was known for his technical skills, leadership and ability both to score and create goals, courtesy of his striking ability, crossing and passing, Arango was a classic number ten, who was capable of playing both as an attacking midfielder and as a winger. Nicknamed Arangol, he was also a dead ball specialist, who was highly regarded by pundits for his exceptional accuracy from free kicks and his ability to bend the ball.

Arango was considered by some in the sport as the greatest Venezuelan footballer of all time.

Career statistics

Club

International
Scores and results list Venezuela's goal tally first, score column indicates score after each Arango goal.

Honours
Pachuca
CONCACAF Champions' Cup: 2002

New York Cosmos
NASL: 2016

Copa América 4th place (copper medal): 2011

Individual
NASL MVP Award: 2016

See also 
 List of men's footballers with 100 or more international caps

References

External links

Real Mallorca bio 

 

1980 births
Living people
Sportspeople from Maracay
Venezuelan people of Colombian descent
Venezuelan footballers
Association football midfielders
Zulia F.C. players
Caracas FC players
Liga MX players
C.F. Monterrey players
C.F. Pachuca players
Club Tijuana footballers
La Liga players
RCD Mallorca players
Bundesliga players
Borussia Mönchengladbach players
North American Soccer League players
New York Cosmos (2010) players
Venezuela international footballers
1999 Copa América players
2001 Copa América players
2004 Copa América players
2007 Copa América players
2011 Copa América players
2015 Copa América players
Venezuelan expatriate footballers
Expatriate footballers in Mexico
Expatriate footballers in Spain
Expatriate footballers in Germany
Expatriate soccer players in the United States
Venezuelan expatriate sportspeople in Mexico
Venezuelan expatriate sportspeople in Spain
Venezuelan expatriate sportspeople in Germany
Venezuelan expatriate sportspeople in the United States
FIFA Century Club